Marion Township is a township in Daviess County, in the U.S. state of Missouri.

Marion Township was established in 1869, and most likely was named after Francis Marion, an officer in the Revolutionary War.

References

Townships in Missouri
Townships in Daviess County, Missouri